The Woodside Formation is a geologic formation in Wyoming. It preserves fossils dating back to the Triassic period.

See also

 List of fossiliferous stratigraphic units in Wyoming
 Paleontology in Wyoming

References

 

Geologic formations of Wyoming
Triassic Idaho
Triassic geology of Wyoming